Blaise Bassoleth (November 20, 1920 – December 24, 1976) was a politician from Burkina Faso who was elected to the French Senate in 1958.

References 

Burkinabé politicians
French Senators of the Fourth Republic
1920 births
1976 deaths
Senators of French West Africa
Burkinabé expatriates in France